Nepali Times (stylized as NEPALI Times) is an English weekly newspaper that provides reporting and commentary on Nepali politics, business, culture, travel and society in 16 pages. The weekly is aimed at the expatriate, diplomatic and business communities in Kathmandu, and through the internet for the Nepali diaspora. It is published by Himalmedia (pl), which also publishes Himal Khabarpatrika. Nepali Times appears every Friday morning in hardcopy with augmented multimedia content on its website.

Since its founding in 2000, the weekly has been edited and published by Kunda Dixit, who also wrote the long-running and popular Under My Hat satirical columns from 2000-2006.

See also
 Himal Khabarpatrika

References

External links
 Nepali Times homepage
 PDF archive on Digital Himalaya

Newspapers published in Nepal
English-language newspapers published in Asia
2000 establishments in Nepal